The 2003–04 Czech 1.liga season was the 11th season of the Czech 1.liga, the second level of ice hockey in the Czech Republic. 14 teams participated in the league, and HC Dukla Jihlava won the championship.

Regular season

Playoffs

Quarterfinals
 HC Beroun – BK Mladá Boleslav 3:0 (5:3, 5:1, 3:2 SN)
 KLH Chomutov – SK Horácká Slavia Třebíč 3:2 (9:2, 4:6, 2:4, 3:1, 2:1)
 HC Dukla Jihlava – HC Hradec Králové 3:0 (2:0, 5:1, 5:4 SN)
 HC Slovan Ústí nad Labem – HC Olomouc 3:2 (7:2, 1:2, 3:6, 4:1, 3:0)

Semifinals 
 KLH Chomutov – HC Dukla Jihlava 1:3 (1:2, 1:4, 3:2 SN, 1:7)
 HC Beroun – HC Slovan Ústí nad Labem 3:0 (1:0 SN, 4:0, 4:3)

Final 
 HC Beroun – HC Dukla Jihlava 2:3 (0:1, 5:2, 1:4, 5:2, 1:4)

Qualification

Relegation

External links
 Season on hockeyarchives.info

2003–04 in Czech ice hockey
Czech
Czech 1. Liga seasons